The Five Colored-Face Devils are a set of five characters featured within the classic Chinese novel Investiture of the Gods (more commonly known as Fengshen Yanyi).

The devils, known as the Five Colored-Face Devils, are situated within a large garden near the Peony Pavilion, and have played in and guarded the pavilion for centuries. One day, Jiang Ziya begins to build a five-room villa within the territory of the five devils. The devils summon a large tornado to destroy the villa. Stones and dust are continuously thrown around while the five demons stand together within their fire whirlwind.

Once Jiang presents himself to the five demons, they all beg for mercy and ask forgiveness, arguing that the area had been their territory. In reply, Jiang tells the five demons to go to the western foothills of Mount Singling Phoenix and never return. The demons comply and are never seen again.

Sources
 Investiture of the Gods chapter 16 pages 184 - 185

Investiture of the Gods characters